Elections were held in Oxford County, Ontario  on October 27, 2014 in conjunction with municipal elections across the province.

Oxford County Council
County council consists of the mayors of the municipalities plus two "city and county" councillors from Woodstock.

Blandford-Blenheim

East Zorra-Tavistock

Ingersoll

Norwich

South-West Oxford

Tillsonburg

Woodstock

Zorra

References

Oxford
Oxford County, Ontario